The Mimi River is a river of the Taranaki Region of New Zealand's North Island. It flows generally southwest from its sources in rough hill country 25 kilometres northeast of Urenui to reach the sea five kilometres northeast of the town. State Highway 3 follows the valley of the Mimi River for part of its length.

See also
List of rivers of New Zealand

References
 

Rivers of Taranaki
Rivers of New Zealand